A virtual trading point is a non-physical hub for trading in natural gas markets, for which "there is a virtual trading point (VTP) for each market area, representing all entry and exit points in that market area."

Examples

 National Balancing Point (UK)
 Title Transfer Facility (Netherlands)
 Zeebrugge Hub (Belgium)
  PEG Nord (France)
  PEG Sud (France) before April 1, 2015
  PEG TIGF (France) before April 1, 2015
  TRS (France) since April 1st, 2015
 MS-ATR (Spain)
 Punto di Scambio Virtuale (Italy)
 Gaspool (Germany)
 NetConnect Germany (Germany)
 Central European Gas Hub (Austria)

See also
 Henry Hub (USA)
 Glossary of terms used in the trading of oil and gas,utilities and mining commodities

References

Natural gas